The 2012–13 United Sikkim F.C. season will be the club's third season since their formation in 2008 and their first season ever in the I-League which is India's top football league.

Background

The road to the 2012 I-League 2nd Division did not start well for United Sikkim. On 11 June 2011 it was announced that Johnny Menyongar would leave the club to join I-League team Shillong Lajong as well as Indian internationals Renedy Singh and NS Manju in January 2012. However, after firing coach Stanley Rozario, United Sikkim signed Belgian Philippe De Ridder as coach of the team. The club the re-signed Nigerian Daniel Bedemi and Quinton Jacobs for the season. The club then began there charge for the I-League for the second season in a row with a 3–2 victory over Bhawanipore F.C. at the Satindra Mohan Dev Stadium in Assam on 2 February 2012. The club then went on to win three more matches during the first round of the I-League 2nd Division against Eagles, Southern Samity, and Ar-Hima in order to qualify for the 2012 I-League 2nd Division Final Round in which the club won promotion on the last day of the season on 17 April 2012 at the Paljor Stadium in Gangtok, Sikkim in front of 30,000 fans as United Sikkim drew Mohammedan 1–1 with Daniel Bedemi scoring the goal for United Sikkim.

Transfers

In

Out

Competitions

Federation Cup

United Sikkim entered the 2012 Indian Federation Cup automatically following promotion to the I-League. They were placed in Group D along with Salgaocar, Pune, and Prayag United and their matches were played in Jamshedpur. The tournament did not end well for United Sikkim as they lost all three of their matches, finishing with 0 points, 0 goals scored and 6 conceded.

I-League

United Sikkim began their first I-League campaign of 2012–13 at home on 6 October 2012 against the champions of the 2010-11 season, Salgaocar and took the victory 3–2 in what is considered an early upset in the season.

Results summary

Position by round

Appearances and goals

Goalscorers

References

United Sikkim F.C. seasons
United Sikkim